Cannady Hill is a mountain in Schoharie County, New York. It is located east of Middleburgh. Windy Ridge is located southwest and Zimmer Hill is located north-northeast of Cannady Hill.

References

Mountains of Schoharie County, New York
Mountains of New York (state)